The following is a list of places named after Saint Francis of Assisi.

Africa

South Africa
Cape St. Francis
St. Francis Bay, a town in the Eastern Cape

America

Argentina
San Francisco, Córdoba
San Francisco del Chañar, Córdoba
San Francisco Pass, Catamarca
San Francisco Solano, Buenos Aires Province

Bolivia
Plaza San Francisco, La Paz

Brazil
Amparo de São Francisco
Barra de São Francisco
Belém de São Francisco
Canindé de São Francisco
Lagoa de São Francisco
Muquém de São Francisco
Santana do São Francisco
São Francisco, Minas Gerais
São Francisco, Paraíba
São Francisco, Sergipe
São Francisco, São Paulo
São Francisco de Assis, Rio Grande do Sul
São Francisco de Assis do Piauí
São Francisco do Brejão
São Francisco do Conde
São Francisco do Glória
São Francisco de Goiás
São Francisco do Guaporé
São Francisco de Itabapoana
São Francisco do Maranhão
São Francisco do Oeste
São Francisco de Paula, Minas Gerais
São Francisco de Paula, Rio Grande do Sul
São Francisco do Pará
São Francisco do Piauí
São Francisco de Sales
São Francisco do Sul
São Francisco River
São Francisco, a neighbourhood in Niterói

Canada 

 St. Francis Of Assisi Middle School in Red Deer, Alberta

Colombia
San Francisco, Putumayo

Costa Rica
San Francisco de Coyote

Dominican Republic
San Francisco de Macorís

Ecuador
San Francisco de Quito

El Salvador
San Francisco Gotera

Mexico
San Francisco Cajonos
San Francisco Tetlanohcan
San Francisco Nayarit

Nicaragua
San Francisco de Cuapa

Panama
San Francisco, Veraguas

United States
 San Francisco, California.  Also in the same area:
 San Francisco Bay, the body of water that adjoins the city
 The San Francisco Bay Area, the surrounding metropolitan region
 St. Francis Wood, a neighborhood of San Francisco, California
 Colleges and universities:
 The University of San Francisco
 The University of California, San Francisco
 San Francisco State University
 City College of San Francisco
 The St. Francis Fountain, a restaurant
 The St. Francis Hotel
 Saint Francis Square Cooperative Apartments
 Saint Francis High School (La Cañada Flintridge, California) in Northeast Los Angeles county, California
 The San Francisco volcanic field is an area of volcanoes in Arizona, not associated with the city in California.
 San Francisco Peaks, the mountain range in which the volcanoes are located
 The St. Francis River in Missouri and Arkansas, after which the following counties were named:
 St. Francois County, Missouri
 St. Francis County, Arkansas
 San Francisco, New Mexico
 San Francisco, Puerto Rico
 San Francisco, Texas
 St. Francis, Arkansas
 St. Francisville, Illinois
 St. Francis, Kansas
 St. Francisville, Louisiana
 St. Francis, Wisconsin
 La Villa Real de la Santa Fé de San Francisco de Asís (the formal name of Santa Fe, New Mexico)
 Saint Francis University in Loretto, Pennsylvania
 The University of Saint Francis in Joliet, Illinois
 The University of Saint Francis in Fort Wayne, Indiana
Saint Francis Episcopal Day School, Potomac, Maryland
Saint Francis Episcopal Day School, Piney Point, Texas
Saint Francis Healthcare, Wilmington, Delaware
OSF Saint Francis Medical Center, Peoria, Illinois, the largest hospital of the OSF HealthCare system run by Franciscan sisters 
Saint Francis Retreat Center, DeWitt, Michigan 
Saint Francis Medical Center, Trenton, New Jersey 
Saint Francis of Assisi Catholic Academy, Brooklyn, New York
Saint Francis College, Brooklyn, New York
Saint Francis Hospital, Poughkeepsie, New York
Saint Francis Hospital, Tulsa, Oklahoma
St. Francis of Assisi Catholic School, Burien, Washington
St. Francis Rabbitry, Hampton, VA

Uruguay
Playa San Francisco, Maldonado Department

Asia

India
St. Francis' College
St Francis D'Assisi High school
St. Francis of Assisi Convent High School

Lebanon
Mar Francis Secteur, Lebanon

Malaysia
St. Francis' Institution
SMK St. Francis Convent (M), Kota Kinabalu

Philippines
 St. Francis of Assisi College Las Pinas, Las Pinas
 St. Francis of Assisi College Bacoor, Bacoor, Cavite
 St. Francis of Assisi College Muntinlupa, Muntinlupa
 San Francisco, Agusan del Sur
 San Francisco, Cebu
 San Francisco, Quezon
 San Francisco, Southern Leyte
 San Francisco, Surigao del Norte

Europe

Italy
Piazza San Francesco (St. Francis square), Pistoia

See also 
 St. Francis (disambiguation)
 Saint-François (disambiguation)

Francis
Francis of Assisi